Kabir Smajić (born 30 May 1977 in Banovići) is a Bosnian retired football player.

References

1977 births
Living people
People from Banovići
Association football midfielders
Bosnia and Herzegovina footballers
FK Sloboda Tuzla players
FC Saturn Ramenskoye players
NK Jedinstvo Bihać players
FK Budućnost Banovići players
NK Bratstvo Gračanica players
Premier League of Bosnia and Herzegovina players
Russian Premier League players
First League of the Federation of Bosnia and Herzegovina players
Bosnia and Herzegovina expatriate footballers
Expatriate footballers in Russia
Bosnia and Herzegovina expatriate sportspeople in Russia